Bertz Erik Olov Zetterberg  (23 November 1930 – 2 April 2011) was a Swedish Olympic ice hockey player, who was part of the Sweden team that finished 4th at the 1956 Winter Olympics. Zetterberg was part of the Djurgården Swedish champions' team of 1950, 1954, 1955, and 1958.

References

Swedish ice hockey players
Djurgårdens IF Hockey players
Olympic ice hockey players of Sweden
Ice hockey players at the 1956 Winter Olympics
1930 births
2011 deaths